The Raigam Tele'es Best Television Children's Program Award is presented annually in Sri Lanka by the Kingdom of Raigam organization for the best Sri Lankan television children's program of the year.

The award was first given in 2005.

Awards list

References

Raigam Tele'es